Pirallahi Island or Pirallakhi Island (Azeri: Pirallahı adası) is an island in the Caspian Sea. The island is part of Azerbaijan, and is located right off the northeastern shore of the Apsheron Peninsula,  to the ENE of Baku.

Administratively, Pirallahi Island belongs to the Pirallahi district of Baku.The total square of the island is 14.6 km².

Oil deposits on the northern part of Pirallahi are estimated at 1.2 million tons. Flights to other Caspian isles are available at the heliport on the southern tip of the island.

History

Pirallahi literally means "the shrine of Allah", from the word pir - a shrine / holy place. In ancient times, there was a place of worship and pilgrimage on the island, but there is no exact data on which religion it belongs to. According to one version, it was a shrine of the Zoroastrians, and according to others, Muslims.

During Russian Imperial times the island's name was Svyatoy (from Russian: Святой - "The holy one"). It is said that undersea booty from a 1660 sea battle between Persians and Cossack leader Stepan Razin lies off the northern tip of the island.

Pirallahi Island is said to be the among the first places where oil was extracted in Azerbaijan, and in the 1820s it was divided into two separate areas, one residential, and another where oil was refined into paraffin. In 1934, oil explorers dropped metal drills off piers from the island, which at the time was considered an advancement in offshore oil exploration.

Artyom Island
While Azerbaijan was part of the Soviet Union, the island was renamed as Artyom Island in the 1936 (Russian: Остров Артёма) after the pioneer revolutionary Comrade Artyom (Fyodor Sergeyev). Pirallahi Island still has a settlement called Artyom.

The old Artyom village was evacuated due to rising water levels of the Caspian Sea and residents moved to a series of apartment towers built by German prisoners in 1948.On October 5, 1999, the current name was returned.

In the early 1950s, by the construction of a dam, the island was connected to the mainland and thus transformed from an island into a peninsula. In 2016, a road bridge was built on the site of the dam, under which ships can pass

Oil and gas production is carried out on the island, fishing is also widespread among the population and there is a fishing port on the island. Previously, the Pirallahi railway station (formerly Artyom) functioned - the terminal on the branch from Baku, at the moment the station and the railway have been dismantled.

Population 
In 1968 the population of the village of Artyom-Ostrov reached 14.4 thousand people. The population of the island is 17,281 people (according to the 2020 census), the density is ~ 3000 people / km².

Solar station 
In order to increase the production of alternative and renewable energy and improve its quality, the Pirallahi solar power plant with a capacity of 2.8 megawatts was commissioned in the Pirallahi district of Baku. The construction of the Pirallahi solar power plant was launched in 2014. After completion of construction by the end of 2020, the plant's capacity will be 12.8 megawatts.

High-Tech Park
A 50-hectare industrial park, High-Tech Park, dedicated to the ICT industry, is being established on the island by the Azerbaijan Ministry of Communications and Information Technologies.

Places of interest

The Pirallahi Lighthouse biggest lighthouse in Azerbaijan is the Absheron lighthouse, located in the territory of Gurgen settlement. The lighthouse, built on hard rocky cliffs at Pirallahi Island built in 1859, was commissioned on October 23, 1860.

 

The Nerekend is fish market and sea food restaurant at the entrance of the Island.

There is also 'FMarine Hotel Resort' in island.

Gallery

References

 History of the oil industry
 Artyom town
 Caspian Sea Biodiversity Project
 Oil detritus
 Environmental problems

External links
 Great Soviet Encyclopedia entry
 Weather reports for Pirallahı Island
 Travel

Islands of Azerbaijan
Islands of the Caspian Sea
Absheron Archipelago